Gábor Agárdy (2 August 1922 – 19 January 2006) was a Hungarian actor, also known as Gábor Agárdi. He was born Gábor Arklian in Szeged of Armenian descent. He was awarded the 2000 Lifetime Award: Actor of the (Hungarian) Nation.

Filmography

External links
  

1922 births
2006 deaths
Hungarian male film actors
Hungarian male television actors
Hungarian people of Armenian descent
People from Szeged